Melrose is a city in Stearns County, Minnesota, United States. The population was 3,598 at the 2010 census. It is part of the St. Cloud Metropolitan Statistical Area.

Geography

Melrose is along Interstate 94/U.S. Highway 52. Other main routes include Stearns County Road 13 and Main Street.

Climate

Demographics

2010 census
As of the census of 2010, there were 3,598 people, 1,309 households, and 890 families living in the city. The racial makeup of the city was 86.1% White, 0.9% African American, 0.2% Native American, 0.6% Asian, 10.7% from other races, and 1.4% from two or more races. Hispanic or Latino of any race were 22.1% of the population.

There were 1,309 households, of which 34.8% had children under the age of 18 living with them, 55.2% were married couples living together, 7.6% had a female householder with no husband present, 5.2% had a male householder with no wife present, and 32% were non-families. 28.1% of all households were made up of individuals, and 15.9% had someone living alone who was 65 years of age or older. The average household size was 2.69 and the average family size was 3.31.

The median age in the city was 36.5 years. 28.1% of residents were under the age of 18; 8.2% were between the ages of 18 and 24; 24.6% were from 25 to 44; 20.4% were from 45 to 64; and 18.9% were 65 years of age or older. The gender makeup of the city was 49.6% male and 50.4% female.

2000 census
As of the census of 2000, there were 3,091 people, 1,157 households, and 797 families living in the city. The racial makeup of the city was 95.76% White, 0.49% African American, 0.06% Native American, 0.55% Asian, 2.52% from other races, and 0.61% from two or more races. Hispanic or Latino of any race were 12.33% of the population.

There were 1,157 households, out of which 35.7% had children under the age of 18 living with them, 57.4% were married couples living together, 7.9% had a female householder with no husband present, and 31.1% were non-families. 27.9% of all households were made up of individuals, and 17.4% had someone living alone who was 65 years of age or older.  The average household size was 2.61 and the average family size was 3.16.
In the city, the population was spread out, with 27.7% under the age of 18, 8.1% from 18 to 24, 26.7% from 25 to 44, 17.4% from 45 to 64, and 20.1% who were 65 years of age or older.  The median age was 36 years. For every 100 females, there were 94.5 males.  For every 100 females age 18 and over, there were 93.8 males.

The median income for a household in the city was $34,432, and the median income for a family was $45,045. Males had a median income of $30,290 versus $20,389 for females. The per capita income for the city was $15,510.  About 4.5% of families and 7.6% of the population were below the poverty line, including 7.8% of those under age 18 and 7.8% of those age 65 or over.

Notable people
Walter Breuning, the oldest man in the world when he died on April 14, 2011; born in Melrose in 1896.
Mitch Clem, cartoonist, creator of Nothing Nice to Say
Bill Daley, football player
Paul Ellering, professional wrestling manager
Blake Elliott, winner of the 2003 Gagliardi Trophy for academic and football excellence.
Calista Flockhart, actress and star of Ally McBeal; lived in Melrose during part of her childhood
Matt Herkenhoff, professional football player.
Charles Lindbergh, first person to fly across the Atlantic Ocean without stopping. Lived in Melrose; some of his childhood toys are in the Melrose Museum, and his grandparents are buried in a cemetery in Melrose.
Joseph T. Niehaus, Sr., Minnesota state legislator, businessman, farmer, and beekeeper, born on a farm near Melrose.
Mark Olberding, professional basketball player.
Amanda Smock, Olympic triple jumper; she grew up in Melrose.
Morvalden Angerstoff Taylor, Minnesota state legislator, farmer, and postmaster.
Edmund C. Tiemann, Minnesota state legislator
Alan Welle, Minnesota state legislator and businessman

References

External links
 Melrose, MN – Official Website
Melrose Area Chamber of Commerce
Melrose Area Schools site
Melrose Beacon newspaper site

Cities in Minnesota
Cities in Stearns County, Minnesota
St. Cloud, Minnesota metropolitan area